The Bishop of Killala is an episcopal title which takes its name after the village of Killala in County Mayo, Ireland. In the Roman Catholic Church it remains a separate title, but in the Church of Ireland it has been united with other bishoprics.

History
The foundation of the Episcopal see of Killala dates to the time of Saint Patrick who had a church built there (Killala Cathedral), over which he placed one of his disciples, Saint Muredach, as its first bishop. Another of early bishop is believed to have been Saint Cellach of Killala. The see was often called the bishopric of Uí Fiachrach Muaidhe or Tir Amalghaid (Tirawley) in the Irish annals. Although the bishopric was founded in the 5th century, it wasn't until AD 1111 that the Diocese of Killala was established by the Synod of Ráth Breasail. Its boundaries comprises the north-eastern portion of County Mayo and the barony of Tireragh in County Sligo. After Bishop Ó Coineóil was restored in 1439, there were a number of rival candidates who were appointed but never took effect.

After the Reformation, there were parallel apostolic successions: one of the Church of Ireland and the other of the Roman Catholic Church.

In the Church of Ireland, Killala continued as a separate title until 1622 when it was combined with Achonry to form the united bishopric of Killala and Achonry. Under the Church Temporalities (Ireland) Act 1833, the combined sees of Killala and Achonry became part of the archbishopric of Tuam in 1834. On the death of Archbishop Le Poer Trench in 1839, the Ecclesiastical Province of Tuam lost its metropolitan status and became the united bishopric of Tuam, Killala and Achonry in the Ecclesiastical Province of Armagh.

In the Roman Catholic Church, Killala remains a separate title. The bishop's seat (cathedra) is located at the Cathedral Church of St Muredach in Ballina, County Mayo. The current ordinary is the Most Reverend John Fleming, Bishop of the Roman Catholic Diocese of Killala, who was appointed by Pope John Paul II on 19 February 2002 and received episcopal ordination on 7 April 2002.

Pre-Reformation bishops
The following is a list of the diocesan bishops of Killala:

Bishops during the Reformation

Post-Reformation bishops

Church of Ireland succession

Roman Catholic succession

Notes

References

 
 
 
 

Killala
Religion in County Mayo
Religion in County Sligo
Anglican bishops of Killala
Roman Catholic bishops of Killala
Killala